Damnation is an American period drama television series. The series was ordered on May 12, 2017. The series is a co-production between Universal Cable Productions and Netflix. Netflix streamed the show worldwide outside the United States, where it aired on USA Network. The series premiered on November 7, 2017. On January 25, 2018, it was announced that the series had been cancelled after one season and was removed from Netflix in 2023.

Plot
Set in 1931 amidst the American labor wars of the Great Depression, Damnation follows Seth Davenport, a man with a violent past who poses as a preacher as he rallies townsfolk to stand up against greedy industrialists and the corruption of the local bankers and businessmen. He is opposed by Creeley Turner, an ex-con and Pinkerton detective brought in to stop Davenport's strike. Neither the townsfolk nor the industrialists know that Seth and Creeley are estranged brothers.

According to creator and showrunner Tony Tost, Damnation is "1/3 Clint Eastwood, 1/3 John Steinbeck, 1/3 James Ellroy. That is, it takes some characters you’d normally see in a tough western, plops them in the world of Grapes of Wrath, and places them in the sort of pulpy paranoid narrative you see in Ellroy’s novels."

Background
The Farmers' Holiday Association campaign for a farm strike in the early 1930s was the event on which the story is based; the Iowa locale in the series is based on Plymouth County, Iowa, during this time, the strike and related events in the county seat of Le Mars, Iowa, and rural areas of the county beginning in early May 1932. This was also the period when the penny auction became a common farmer tactic.

A coal miners' strike at the same time in Kentucky, known as the Harlan County War or Bloody Harlan, is the basis for that element of the plot. The Sheriff J. H. Blair and Florence Reece are historical characters, with Reece's folk song "Which Side Are You On?" (performed in the second episode) being inspired by Sheriff Blair's actions during the Harlan County War.

The Pinkerton Detective Agency, which employs Creeley Turner and the William J. Burns International Detective Agency, which employs Connie Nunn, are real agencies that focused on strikebreaking in the 1930s.

The villainous Black Legion vigilante group in Damnation is based on the 1930s militant fascistic paramilitary group of the same name. The Black Legion terrorized ethnic, political and religious minorities throughout the Midwest, targeting labor organizers and striking workers in particular.

Cast

Main
 Killian Scott as Seth Davenport, an enigmatic preacher with a mysterious past who is behind the strikes in Holden County.
 Logan Marshall-Green as Creeley Turner, Seth's older brother, a convicted murderer, and a Pinkerton detective.
 Sarah Jones as Amelia Davenport, Seth's politically radical wife, who writes inflammatory sermons under the alias "Dr. Samuel T. Hopkins."
 Chasten Harmon as Bessie Louvin, an African American prostitute at the local brothel, who is literate and cunning, and is hired by Creeley to be his secretary.
 Christopher Heyerdahl as Don Berryman, the amoral sheriff of Holden County who runs the town's bootlegging and gambling operations.
 Melinda Page Hamilton as Connie Nunn, a cold-blooded and murderous agent of the William J. Burns International Detective Agency, who believes that Seth Davenport killed her strikebreaking husband.
 Joe Adler as D. L. Sullivan, a reporter for the town's local newspaper, who nurses literary ambitions and comes to sympathize with the Davenports' labor crusade.

Recurring
 Paul Rae as Melvin Stubbs, a local food distributor and the grandmaster of the Black Legion, who is campaigning to replace Berryman as sheriff in an upcoming election.
 Phillipa Domville as Martha Riley, the wife of Sam Riley, the late leader of the farmers' strike.
 David Haysom as Deputy Sheriff Raymond Berryman, Sheriff Berryman's dimwitted and occasionally brutal nephew.
 Dan Donohue as Calvin Rumple, a corrupt local banker who is fixing food prices in the county at the behest of powerful industrial interests.
 Tom Butler as Burt Babbage, the editor of the local newspaper who makes sure no news of the strike is reported.
 Juan Javier Cardenas as Lew Nez, a mixed-race childhood friend of Seth and Creeley's who is wanted in five states for bank robbery.
 Arnold Pinnock as Victor, an African American dairy farmer and World War I veteran.
 Teach Grant as Preston Riley, Sam's alcoholic cousin.
 Gabriel Mann as Martin Eggers Hyde, PhD, a highly educated fixer for the industrialist Duvall family, who controls Creeley Turner's actions and fate.
 Zach McGowan as Tennyson Duvall, an ambitious, art-loving philanthropist heir to the Duvall family fortune who aspires to replace farmers with modern industrial processes.
 Timothy V. Murphy as Gram Turner, Seth and Creeley's cruel father and a mercenary for oil interests.
 Bradley Stryker as Tanner Phillips, an employee of the local food distributor and one of the leaders of the Black Legion.
 Rohan Mead as Sam Riley Jr., the son of Sam Riley, the late leader of the farmers' strike.
 Alexis McKenna as Brittany Butler, a young girl orphaned and then adopted by the murderous Connie Nunn to help her pose as a grieving mother.
 Hannah Masi as Cynthia Rainey, Seth's first love from his youth in Wyoming.
 Nola Augustson as Della, the madam of the local brothel and Sheriff Berryman's sister-in-law.

Special Guests
 Luke Harper as Pitchfork Perry, a traveling professional wrestler on the carnival circuit.

Guest Stars
 Blair Williams as Sam Riley.
 Thomas Nicholson as Remy Johnson.
 Jerod Thomas Winfrey Blake as Prisoner #2.

Production
Originally, Aden Young was set to play the lead role, but he dropped out due to creative differences and was later replaced by Killian Scott.

Episodes

Reception
Reviews for the show were positive to mixed. Alan Sepinwall wrote: "Tost and company do a nice job illustrating all the people in the story — usually women — pushing up against barriers that go beyond economics...The men dominate the story because of the era and the type of show this is, but the women feel much more complex and original. Emily VanDerWerff wrote that at Damnation's center "is a world and time period that TV hasn’t ever explored as thoroughly as it could, and it’s clear that all involved (but especially creator Tony Tost) have done their research. The same growing pains that nearly all dramas face are clear and evident, but Damnation has a setting and point of view...Slow-moving and enamored of its own darkness as Damnation is, there’s something vital and real in the show’s insistence that the United States’ institutions have failed and are only looking out for themselves." Alexis Gunderson compared Damnation favorably to Netflix's Godless, writing that "Damnation actually followed through on its promise to interrogate the corruption of capitalism and racism and the gulf of messy morality between what is good for the individual and what is good for society." Mark Dawidziak of the Cleveland Plain Dealer wrote that the show feels like "a powerful collaboration between Nobel Prize-winning author John Steinbeck and pioneering mystery writer Dashiell Hammett...Although set during the Depression, "Damnation" is a series packing a tremendous thematic punch for 2017 viewers."

The review aggregator website Rotten Tomatoes reported a 64% approval rating, with an average rating of 6.36/10 based on 25 reviews. Users gave the show a 91% approval rating, with an average rating of 4.5/5 based on 272 reviews. The website's consensus states "'Damnation's' complex character driven mystery is intriguing, though it occasionally feels like homework."

References

External links
 
 
 

2010s American drama television series
2017 American television series debuts
2018 American television series endings
Television series set in 1931
Great Depression television series
USA Network original programming
English-language Netflix original programming
Serial drama television series
Television series by Universal Content Productions
Television shows set in Iowa
Television shows filmed in Calgary
Television series about brothers